The 145th Mixed Brigade was a unit of the Spanish Republican Army created during the Spanish Civil War. Throughout the war, it operated on the Aragon, Segre and Catalonia fronts, although it did not play a relevant role.

History 
The unit was created in Girona between May and June 1937, from troops from the old Mountain battalions. After completing the training period, the 145th Mixed Brigade was assigned to the 44th Division of the XII Army Corps and under the command of the militia major Álvaro Costea Juan, with Antonio Rodés Ballester as political commissar. The brigade, located in the Híjar-Albalate del Arzobispo area, was deployed as a reserve force during the Zaragoza Offensive.

In the spring of 1938, during the Aragon Offensive, it did not play a prominent role.

At the end of May, the 145th Mixed Brigade took part in the assault on the nationalist bridgehead of Serós. In August it was one of the units selected to participate in the Vilanova de la Barca offensive. On August 9, three of their companies crossed the Segre river through the Vilanova de la Barca area, together with other forces, managing to form a bridgehead in nationalist territory; the attempt, however, failed since this bridgehead only held out for three days.

Later it intervened in the Battle of the Ebro, in support of the republican forces deployed there. On September 9, it relieved members of the 16th Division in the Vilalba dels Arcs-La Pobla de Masaluca sector, a zone that it garrisoned until the beginning of October, when it was replaced and sent to the Coll del Coso sector. In this area, between La Fatarella and Venta de Camposines, the 145th Mixed brigade faced several nationalist attacks between October 8 and 20; the brigade suffered a considerable number of casualties, also losing several strategic positions. On November 12, it had to cross the Ebro River by a footbridge north of Ascó.

During the Catalonia Offensive it participated in the defense of Juncosa and Santa Coloma de Queralt, without having more news of its performance.

Command 
 Commanders
 Infantry Captain Fernando Olivenza Rodríguez;
 Militia Major Álvaro Costea Juan;
 Militia Major Pedro Guardia Hernández;

 Commissars
 Antonio Rodés Ballester, of the CNT;
 Víctor Torres Pereyra;

Chief of Staff
 Militia Lieutenant Ángel Royo Royo;

Notes

References

Bibliography 
 
 
 
 
 
 

Military units and formations established in 1937
Military units and formations disestablished in 1939
Mixed Brigades (Spain)
Military units and formations of the Spanish Civil War
Military history of Spain
Armed Forces of the Second Spanish Republic